The 2023 AfroBasket Women will be the 26th edition of the tournament and held from 28 July to 6 August 2023 in Kigali, Rwanda.

Qualification

Qualified teams

References

 
2023
2023 in African basketball
Women's Afrobasket
Women's Afrobasket
2023 in women's basketball
International basketball competitions hosted by Rwanda
AfroBasket